3α,5α-Tetrahydrocorticosterone (3α,5α-THB), or simply tetrahydrocorticosterone (THB or THCC), is an endogenous glucocorticoid hormone.

See also
 5α-Dihydrocorticosterone
 Tetrahydrodeoxycorticosterone
 Dihydrodeoxycorticosterone
 Allopregnanolone
 Tetrahydrocortisone
 Tetrahydrocortisol

References

Glucocorticoids
Ketones
Pregnanes
Steroid hormones